New Hampshire's 12th State Senate district is one of 24 districts in the New Hampshire Senate. It has  been represented by Republican Kevin Avard since 2020, following his victory over incumbent Democrat Melanie Levesque.

Geography
District 12 covers Nashua's 1st, 2nd, and 5th wards, as well as several towns to its west, including Brookline, Greenville, Hollis, Mason, New Ipswich, and Rindge. It is mostly within Hillsborough County, with a small portion extending into Cheshire County.

The district is entirely located within New Hampshire's 2nd congressional district. It borders the state of Massachusetts.

Recent election results

2020

2018

2016

2014

2012

Federal and statewide results in District 12

References

12
Cheshire County, New Hampshire
Hillsborough County, New Hampshire